Marie Avgeropoulos (Greek: Μαρία "Μαρί" Αυγεροπούλου, born 17 June 1986) is a Canadian actress and model. She is best known for her role as Octavia Blake on The CW's post-apocalyptic science fiction television series The 100 (2014–2020).

Early life
Avgeropoulos was born on 17 June 1986 in Thunder Bay, Ontario to Greek parents. She grew up fishing, hunting and camping, spending most of her free time outdoors. She started playing drums when she was 16. After studying broadcast journalism for two years in her hometown, she moved to Europe. Several months later, she came back to Canada and settled in Vancouver. At the age of 20 she underwent surgery in order to remove a big tumour from her chest and throat, with her vocal cords being removed and put back in. This procedure affected her voice.

Career
One of her friends invited her for a casting call in Vancouver, which happened to be looking for drummers. A talent agent recognized her talent and invited her to appear in various national commercials. She caught the attention of director Chris Columbus. He hired Avgeropoulos for I Love You, Beth Cooper, which became her first feature film role. Her appearance in the film gave her the opportunities to star in more films, television shows and magazines.

In 2010, Avgeropoulos was cast as Kim Rhodes in the film Hunt to Kill, which became her break-out role.

Early in 2013, Avgeropoulos made her break-out in television after being cast for a recurring role in The CW's Cult. However, the series failed to attract viewers and after episode 7, the show was cancelled. The remaining six episodes of the show were broadcast later in the summer.

Not long after the show ended, The CW cast her as one of the main characters in their new sci-fi, The 100, to portray the character Octavia Blake.

Personal life
In late 2018, Avgeropoulos was involved in a domestic violence incident when she and her boyfriend allegedly began arguing in a car on the Ventura Freeway shortly after midnight on 5 August 2018. Avgeropoulos was on new medication mixed with alcohol, and was accused of striking him multiple times in the head, neck and arm, resulting in minor injuries according to the District Attorney's Office. She was then charged with domestic violence. Avgeropoulos' boyfriend wanted the charges dropped and stated that she does not pose a threat.
The case was formally dismissed with all charges dropped, as there was no intent of harm on Avgeropoulos' part, but rather "an adverse reaction to medication that triggered the outburst."

She was previously in a relationship with American actor Taylor Lautner from 2013 until 2015.

Filmography

Film

Television

References

External links

 

1986 births
Living people
Canadian people of Greek descent
Canadian film actresses
21st-century Canadian actresses
People from Thunder Bay
Actresses from Ontario
Canadian television actresses